People Management (PM) is the UK's biggest human resources (HR) publication, with an average circulation of 134,853 (2015). It is the official magazine of the Chartered Institute of Personnel and Development (CIPD), and is published by Haymarket Media Group.

In 1996, it became the first magazine in the UK to refuse “ageist” recruitment advertisements, as the start of a campaign against age discrimination, which saw PM draw up a charter that was eventually signed by 65 recruitment communications and marketing businesses..

In addition to age discrimination, the magazine has worked to raise awareness of the employment issues facing employees with mental illness, ex-offenders, dyslexic people, women, ethnic minorities, people with disabilities, and gay, lesbian and bisexual workers. It has also highlighted best practice in managing and supporting employees with cancer. In 2006, it ran a successful campaign to draw attention to the issue of pregnancy at work, for which it joined forces with baby charity Tommy's.

Its website includes an HR jobs search and a supplier directory. In 2011, People Management changed from a fortnightly publication schedule to a monthly one. April 2011 was the first monthly issue to be published. In 2015, international editions of People Management were launched in the Middle East and Asia.

Awards 
2015: the April 2015 "Sex, drugs and crossbows" cover wins BSME business brand cover of the year  
 2015: People Management named 'HR publication of the year' at the annual Towers Watson awards 
 2013: People Management named 'Best for Membership (Not-for-profit/Charities/Associations)' at the International Content Marketing Awards
 2011: People Management shortlisted for the Stonewall publication of the year award – the second time PM has made the shortlist
 2007: PM editor Steve Crabb won editor of the year in the British Society of Magazine Editors (BSME) annual awards (business and professional non-weekly category); editor Susanne Lawrence had previously won it in 1993
 2001: the magazine won the 'Media' award from Help the Aged in their NOJO awards for their campaigning work on age discrimination
 1999 and 2000: PM won 'Most Effective Business-to-Business Title' and 'Website of the Year' in the APA Awards 
 1992: the magazine won overall best cover in the Magazine Publishing Awards (business category);
 1992: PM journalist D. MacKenzie Davey won best regular columnist in the Magazine Publishing Awards (business category); editor Susanne Lawrence had won the award for best specialist columnist in 1983
 1989: the magazine won best feature in the Magazine Publishing Awards (business magazine category)
 1989 and 1980: PM journalist Jane Pickard won magazine industrial journalist of the year at the Industrial Society; editor Susanne Lawrence had previously won it in 1980
 1988: the magazine won best use of illustration in the Magazine Publishing Awards, for an article on transvestism
 1988: the magazine won best specialist columnist, for 'Computerfile', at the Magazine Publishing Awards (business category)

Previous names 
 Since 1995: People Management, incorporating Personnel Management, PM Plus, Training and Development, and Transition
 1990–1995: PM Plus 
 1986–1990: IPM Digest
 1969–1980: Personnel Management
 1967–1969: Personnel
 1947–1967: Personnel Management

Editors
 1970: Pam Pocock
 1974: Susanne Lawrence
 1994: Rob MacLachlan
 1999: Steve Crabb
 2008: Rob MacLachlan
 2012: Robert Jeffery

Publishing history 
 October 2015: People Management Asia, and People Management Middle East are launched
 July 2012: Contract moves to Haymarket Media Group
 April 2011: People Management reverts to monthly frequency
 January 1995: People Management launched as a fortnightly publication to coincide with merger of IPM and Institute of Training and Development (ITD); new title incorporates Personnel Management, PM Plus, Training and Development and Transition
 July 1990: PM Plus launched as new mid-monthly edition of Personnel Management, replacing IPM's house journal IPM Digest
 1981: Susanne Lawrence together with David Evans of Centurion Press set up new company, Personnel Publications Ltd (PPL), to produce Personnel Management for IPM; contract moves from Business Publications. First issue under PPL – July
 May 1969: Contract moves from Haymarket to Mercury House Business Publications Ltd (BPL). BPL's long-standing independent monthly Personnel and Training Management (formerly Personnel Management and Methods) becomes Personnel Management, monthly magazine of IPM. Editors – Anthony Barry, Pamela Pocock, Susanne Lawrence
 October 1967: IPM contracts magazine out to Haymarket Press; retitled Personnel
 1947–67: Institute of Personnel Management (IPM) publishes own quarterly magazine called Personnel Management

References

External links
 People Management
 People Management ME
 People Management Asia
 Coaching at Work – no longer published

Monthly magazines published in the United Kingdom
Business magazines published in the United Kingdom
Human resource management publications
Magazines established in 1947
Biweekly magazines published in the United Kingdom
Quarterly magazines published in the United Kingdom